Boutros Romhein (1949) is a contemporary Syrian sculptor.

Born in 1949 in a southern Syrian town, he grew up in a land where the great Mediterranean civilisations had flourished and where many different peoples evolved their different cultures.

Background 

During his classical studies in Damascus Boutros learned crafts techniques as a summer apprentice in the city's workshops. At an early age his vocation as an artist became manifest. At eighteen he opened his own studio in Damascus and began to exhibit in solo and group shows. He continued his preparation as an artist by journeying through Europe – Spain, France, Italy and Switzerland.

Philosophy 

Boutros relates to marble as the material that best incarnates what his spirit elaborates (as olive wood previously did).

The School 

It has always been imperative for Boutros Romhein to hand on his craft as a sculptor (which he sees also as a way of life) and at the same time to enrich his own personal experience.

Works 

Romhein Boutros classifies his works according to three groups: “metaphoric": bearers of forms, based on the attribution of an expression or a story deep-rooted in human life; "figuration": these works go beyond mere figurative art to embrace symbolic forms, through their elegant lines and volumes; lastly, the "monumental" works that become a synthesis of Romhein's individual style.

External links 
 Boutros Romhein official site
 Sculpture school in Carrara

1949 births
Living people
Syrian sculptors
21st-century Syrian artists
20th-century Syrian artists